Fuat Yaman (born 5 December 1958) is a Turkish football coach and former player who last managed Bandırmaspor.

Career
Yaman is a product of the Beşiktaş J.K. youth system having played 4 years with the club. He became professional at Beşiktaş at second half of 1978–79 season. He also played for Zonguldakspor (1980–1984) and (1985–1986), Antalyaspor (1984–1985), Eskişehirspor (1986–1988), Konyaspor (1988–1990), Sakaryaspor (1990–1992) and Zeytinburnuspor (1992–1993) as midfielder. He retired in 1993.

He was the assistant of John Benjamin Toshack at Beşiktaş J.K. When the Welshman was sacked he was appointed interim manager for a while.

He also coached Çanakkale Dardanelspor, Kayserispor, Çaykur Rizespor, İstanbulspor, Kocaelispor, Konyaspor and Bandırmaspor.

Yaman then went to Azerbaijan to coach Karvan he was sacked when Karvan was knocked out from the UEFA Intertoto-Cup.

External links
 
 
 
 Fuat Yaman (coach) at Mackolik.com 

1958 births
Living people
Turkish football managers
Konyaspor footballers
Antalyaspor footballers
Sakaryaspor footballers
Eskişehirspor footballers
Zeytinburnuspor footballers
Expatriate football managers in Azerbaijan
Turkish footballers
İstanbulspor managers
Beşiktaş J.K. managers
Association football midfielders
Turkish expatriate football managers